Ben 10: Alien Force – The Rise of Hex is a platform game released for the Wii and Xbox 360 in 2010. It is the fourth game in the Ben 10 video game series and the third game based on the Ben 10: Alien Force series. It is no longer available after being pulled from both WiiWare and Xbox Live Arcade.

Overview
Ben 10 Alien Force: The Rise of Hex is a side-scrolling 2D-platformer, where the player controls Ben Tennyson and several of his alien-forms in an attempt to stop Hex from taking over the world. Throughout the game, players are able to transform into ten aliens, including: Lodestar, Humungousaur, Jetray, Spidermonkey, Big Chill, Swampfire, Goop, Brainstorm, Echo Echo, and Chromastone.

Reception

Ben 10 Alien Force: The Rise of Hex received mixed reviews. Ryan Clement of IGN called it, "a waste of ten dollars. It has mundane, awkward platforming, no story context, and a strange difficulty imbalance."

References

2010 video games
Platform games
Video games developed in the United States
Video games set in the United States
Xbox 360 Live Arcade games
Xbox 360 games
WiiWare games
Video game sequels
Video games with 2.5D graphics
Video games with cel-shaded animation
Video games based on Ben 10
Ben 10
Superhero video games
Konami games
Single-player video games
Cartoon Network video games
Black Lantern Studios games